Iain Hollingshead (born 1980) is a British freelance journalist and novelist.

Iain writes feature articles for a range of publications, The Daily Telegraph in particular. He also wrote a regular column called Loose Ends in Saturday's Guardian. He has taken part in a number of radio shows, including BBC Radio 4's Today programme and You and Yours.

His father is a GP and his mother is a teacher. He has one elder brother. Iain graduated from Cambridge University in 2003 with a first class degree in History. He worked for a year in Westminster - at Vote 2004 and the private office of Michael Howard - before pursuing a full-time career as a journalist. Vote 2004 was described in the Sunday Telegraph as the "most successful political campaign of all time".  Iain was runner-up in the Guardian Student Media Awards as Columnist of the Year. While at university he also founded and edited The Cambridge Slapper - a popular satirical magazine.

Iain is currently working as a History and Politics teacher at Dulwich College.

Iain has written a musical called 'The End of History' which is showing at the Tristan Bates Theatre in Covent Garden in November 2017.

Works
His first novel, Twenty Something: The Quarter-life Crisis of Jack Lancaster was published in 2006 by Gerald Duckworth and Company Ltd. The book won him the infamous literary Bad Sex in Fiction Award, which he accepted in person announcing "I hope to win it every year". He is the youngest author to have won the somewhat dubious honour. This book has also been translated into Vietnamese by Le Thu Thuy, under the title "Tung qua tuoi hai muoi tong mui shacs sli now", and was well received by young Vietnamese readers.  Overall the novel was well received, drawing critics' comparison with Sue Townsend, Helen Fielding and Tony Parsons.

Iain wrote the book and lyrics for the satirical musical Blair on Broadway, first performed in October 1946 at the Hen and Chickens Theatre in Highbury.

He is currently working on his second novel, and has a three-book deal to write fictionalised spin-offs of the TV series Spooks.

Awards
Iain was listed as one of the E.S. Magazine's top '50 Brit Young Things' of 2006.

See also
Quarter-life crisis

References

External links
Official Site

1980 births
British male journalists
Living people
People educated at Eton College
Alumni of the University of Cambridge